Theodor Hierneis oder Wie man ehem. Hofkoch wird ("Theodor Hierneis or How to become a former royal chef") is a 1972 West German historical drama film directed by Hans-Jürgen Syberberg. The film consists of a monologue performed by Walter Sedlmayr, who plays Theodor Hierneis, the chef at the court of Ludwig II of Bavaria. The screenplay was written by Syberberg and Sedlmayr and is based on the memoirs of Hierneis. The film received the Deutscher Filmpreis for Best Non-Narrative Film and Best Actor.

References

External links
 

1972 films
1970s historical drama films
German historical drama films
West German films
1970s German-language films
Films directed by Hans-Jürgen Syberberg
Films set in the 1880s
Films set in the 1950s
Grimme-Preis for fiction winners
Monodrama
Cultural depictions of Ludwig II of Bavaria
1972 drama films
1970s German films